A solar hydrogen panel is a device for artificial photosynthesis that produces photohydrogen directly from sunlight and water vapor utilizing photocatalytic water splitting and thus bypasses the conversion losses of the classical solar–hydrogen energy cycle where solar power is first harvested with solar panels and only then to converted to hydrogen with electrolysis plants.

In the solar hydrogen panel the hydrogen and oxygen evolution reactions are performed in the gas phase in cathode and anode compartments separated by a membrane. Anion exchange membranes provide an alkaline environment enabling the use of earth abundant materials as electrocatalysts.

Scientists at KU Leuven's Center for Surface Chemistry and Catalysis in Leuven, Belgium have managed to produce a solar hydrogen panel, which is able to directly convert no less than 15 per cent of sunlight into hydrogen gas, which according to them is a world record. According to IEEE Spectrum in 2019 this is a giant leap from 0.1% efficiency 10 years earlier. On 19 February 2021, exactly 2 years after their original reveal of the panel, KU Leuven launched the Solhyd Project and website.

Solar hydrogen panels seem very promising for the green hydrogen economy as this method of producing hydrogen fuel emits no , unlike steam reforming from natural gas and then utilizing the water-gas shift reaction to produce hydrogen. As of 2015 the majority of  worldwide was produced via steam methane reforming, at prices down to $1 / kg . In 2019 the IEA reported that electrolysis of water, another green way to produce hydrogen, accounts for less than 0.1% of global hydrogen production.

Due to the challenges in hydrogen storage, other methods of energy storage and delivery may be useful, despite of the conversion losses in power-to-gas.

See also 
 Hydrogen infrastructure
 Timeline of hydrogen technologies
 Liquid hydrogen
 Compressed hydrogen
 Hydrogen vehicle
 Fuel cell vehicle
 Hydrogen internal combustion engine vehicle
 Hydrogen-powered aircraft
 Powerpaste, a magnesium and hydrogen -based fluid paste that releases hydrogen when it reacts with water
 Biohydrogen

References 
.

External links 
 Official website of the Solhyd Project by KU Leuven
 A news article 'Green energy breakthrough thanks to KU Leuven scientists' at stories.kuleuven.be (2019-10-02)
  (2019-03-25)
 An interview 'Looking past the hype: KU Leuven researchers shed more light on their hydrogen panel' with Johan Martens and Tom Bosserez at nieuws.kuleuven.be (2019-03-25) 
 'Surface Chemistry and Catalysis: Characterisation and Application Team (COK-KAT)' in the organizational chart of kuleuven.be
Solar System Installation

Photochemistry
Hydrogen production
Hydrogen technologies
Environmental chemistry
Environmental science